Þórðr Kolbeinsson (Thordr Kolbeinsson) was an 11th-century Icelandic skald, or poet. He was the court poet of Eiríkr Hákonarson and some 17 stanzas of his poetry on the earl are preserved in the kings' sagas. The following example is from Eiríkr's campaign in England with Canute the Great.

Þórðr is one of the two main characters of Bjarnar saga, where many lausavísur are attributed to him. Þórðr's son, Arnórr Þórðarson jarlaskáld, also became a prestigious poet.

References
Þórðr Kolbeinsson All extant poetry
Heimskringla Laing's translation
Knýtlinga saga Extract
Bjarnar saga Hítdælakappa

11th-century Icelandic poets